This page is a list of classified buildings Grade IIs in the London Borough of Wandsworth.

|}

See also
 Grade I and II* listed buildings in the London Borough of Wandsworth

Notes

External links
 

 
Lists of Grade II listed buildings in London